The 2017 Bethune–Cookman Wildcats football team represented Bethune–Cookman University in the 2017 NCAA Division I FCS football season. They ere led by third-year head coach Terry Sims and played their home games at Municipal Stadium. They were a member of the Mid-Eastern Athletic Conference (MEAC). They finished the season 7–4, 6–2 in MEAC play to finish in a tie for second place.

Schedule

Source: Schedule

Game summaries

at Miami (FL)

at Southeastern Louisiana

at Florida Atlantic

at Howard

Savannah State

South Carolina State

at North Carolina A&T

Hampton

Morgan State

at North Carolina Central

vs Florida A&M

References

Bethune-Cookman
Bethune–Cookman Wildcats football seasons